Enageti is  a village in Tetritskaro Municipality (Asureti Temi), Georgia. It is located south of Trialeti Range.

See also
 Kvemo Kartli

Populated places in Tetritsqaro Municipality